Paul Bruno is a French professional rugby union player. He currently plays at prop for Bayonne in the Top 14.

References

External links
Ligue Nationale De Rugby profile
European Professional Club Rugby profile
Bayonne profile

1992 births
Living people
French rugby union players
Rugby union props
Aviron Bayonnais players